Women Must Dress is a 1935 American romantic comedy film directed by Reginald Barker and starring Minna Gombell and Gavin Gordon. It was produced and co-written by the former silent film actress Dorothy Davenport, who had been working as a producer since the death of her husband Wallace Reid in 1923. The film was a rare leading role for Gombell, and marked the film debut of Jon Hall, albeit under his birth name Charles Locher.

Premise
Linda Howard discovers that her husband is having an affair and takes their young adult daughter Janet away to start a new life. Linda becomes a successful fashion designer but begins to re-examine her own life choices when Janet forsakes her successful-but-bland doctor boyfriend for a faster, more loose set of companions.

Production
Production likely began in October, 1934. The cast list included, according to The Hollywood Filmograph, "winners of the Monogram Agfa Amsco contest." Filming took ten days on a budget of around $75,000.

Availability
Copyright has lapsed since the original theatrical run of Women Must Dress, and the film is now in public domain.

References

External links
 
 
 Silent Film Still Archive

1935 films
American black-and-white films
1930s romantic comedy-drama films
Monogram Pictures films
1930s English-language films
Films about fashion
Films directed by Reginald Barker
American romantic comedy-drama films
1935 comedy films
1935 drama films
1930s American films